Akae Beka is a roots reggae band who come from Saint Croix, U.S. Virgin Islands, which was founded by members of the band Midnite following a change in their membership in 2015.  In February of that year, the former band Midnite cancelled their 2015 tour and postponed dates "due to a life changing medical emergency, convictions, and revelations".

The band's leader Vaughn Benjamin explained that the name Akae Beka are two words that come from the Book of Enoch, cited in chapter 68, verse 20-24.

Akae Beka's first performance took place in Denver, Colorado on July 17, 2015, in honor of Nelson Mandela Day.

Benjamin died on November 4, 2019. in Port St Lucie, FL

He was buried the following weeks in his birthplace of Antigua. Laid to rest on November 25, 2019, following a private family funeral. No cause of death has ever been released by the family or any members. .

On February 12, 2020, the Akae Beka band played its final tribute show at The Worldbeat cultural center in San Diego, Ca. Edmund Fieulleteau Performed vocals In Honor of Vaughn. It was also the same venue as the final show Performed with Vaughn 5 months prior on September 23, 2019.

In 2020 Protocols, a posthumous album, was released. 

Many albums and collaborations still remain unreleased.

Discography 
 2015 - Homage to The Land 
 2016 - Portals,  I Grade collaboration
 2016 - Loyalty (Single), Iaahden Sounds
 2016 - New Page (Single), Iaahden Sounds
 2016 - Livicated, Zion I Kings and I Grade Records
 2017 - Jahsaydo, Uhuru Boys Records
 2018 - Kings Dub,  I Grade Records (DIGITAL RELEASE)
 2018 - Nurtured Frequency, Haze St. Studios
 2018 - Topaz, Ocean Records
 2019 - Hail The King ,Higherbound 
 2019 - Mek A Menshun
 2020 - Protocols - Iaahden Sounds
 2021 - Righteous Synergy, Fifth Son Records 
2021 - Polarities (I Grade) 
2022 - Riddims composed by Vaughn Benjamin Recorded Oct 2019 (Trinity Farms)

References

External links 
 

American reggae musical groups
United States Virgin Islands musicians
Musical groups established in 2015
2015 establishments in the United States Virgin Islands